Ouled Selam District is a district of Batna Province, Algeria.

Districts of Batna Province